Stefan Wäkevä, a Finnish silversmith, and a Fabergé workmaster. Born 4 November in Väkevälä village Säkkijärvi in the Viipuri Province of the Grand Duchy of Finland in 1833.
Apprentice in St. Petersburg at the workshop of silversmith Olof Fredrik Wennerström in 1843. Journeyman at the age of fourteen in 1847. Master in 1856. 
Wäkevä's workshop at 41 of the fifth of Roždestvenskaya (Sovetskaya) Street supplied Fabergé with silverware, mostly tea-services, tankards and punch bowls. 

Stefan Wäkevä's hallmark was the letters S.W in a circle. His two sons (Alexander Wäkevä and Konstantin Wäkevä) also worked for Fabergé, taking over his father's workshop at his death in 1910.

References
 H.C. Bainbridge, Peter Carl Fabergé: Goldsmith and Jeweller to the Russian Imperial Court (1966)
 Ulla Tillander-Godenhielm, Personal and Historical Notes on Fabergé's Finnish workmasters and designers (1980)
 G.von Habsburg-Lothringen & A.von Solodkoff, Fabergé - Court Jeweler to the Tsars (1979) 
 Ulla Tillander-Godenhielm, Fabergén suomalaiset mestarit (Fabergé´s Finnish masters)  (2011) pp. 225-241. 

1833 births
1910 deaths
People from Vyborg District
People from Viipuri Province (Grand Duchy of Finland)
Finnish goldsmiths
Finnish silversmiths
Fabergé workmasters